Chuncheon Puppet festival is an annual puppet festival held in Chuncheon, South Korea that includes both Korean and international performers. 

The 2022 edition is set to take place at the Chuncheon Puppet Theatre.(춘천인형극장)

The main festival of the 34th Chuncheon Puppet Festival will be held for 10 days from August 26 (Fri) to September 4 (Sun). The Chuncheon Puppet Theatre.(춘천인형극장) and the entire Chuncheon-si area are to be filled with various puppet show festival programs.

More than 50 domestic and international puppet shows and colorful festival programs.

The large-scale parade of the 34th Chuncheon Puppet Festival will visit the audience on August 28 (Sunday).

See also
List of festivals in South Korea
List of festivals in Asia

External links
The festival's official website

Arts festivals in South Korea
Puppet festivals
Chuncheon
Tourist attractions in Gangwon Province, South Korea
Annual events in South Korea
Theatre festivals in South Korea
Autumn events in South Korea